The New Mexico Open is the New Mexico state open golf tournament, open to both amateur and professional golfers. It is organized by the Sun Country section of the PGA of America. It has been played annually since 1954 at a variety of courses around the state.

In 2011 it was hosted at Santa Ana Golf Club on the Santa Ana Pueblo, just north of Albuquerque. Rio Rancho native Timothy Madigan claimed the Championship in his first professional event and also set the scoring record of 20-under par while doing so.

Winners

2022 Matthis Lefèvre (amateur)
2021 Sam Saunders
2020 No tournament
2019 Blake Cannon
2018 Sam Saunders
2017 Tyler Torano
2016 Nick Mason
2015 Nick Mason
2014 Nick Mason
2013 Charlie Beljan
2012 Wil Collins
2011 Timothy Madigan
2010 Chad Saladin
2009 Ben Kern
2008 Brian Kortan
2007 Jaxon Brigman
2006 Richard Swift
2005 Steve Friesen
2004 Ryan Nietfeldt
2003 Michael Letzig
2002 Mike Sauer
2001 Mike Troyer
2000 D. J. Brigman
1999 Dan Koesters
1998 Notah Begay III
1997 Cameron Doan
1996 Mike Zaremba
1995 Ray Cragun
1994 Mike Putnam
1993 Mike Putnam
1992 Paul Stankowski
1991 Mark Pelletier
1990 Mark Pelletier
1989 Mike Putnam
1988 Mike Putnam
1987 John Kienle
1986 Steve Haskins
1985 Mike Putnam
1984 Gene Torres
1983 Mark Pelletier
1982 Ernesto Acosta
1981 Jim Dickson
1980 Don Hurter
1979 Pete Summerbell
1978 Pete Summerbell
1977 Joe McDermott
1976 Jim Marshall
1975 Jim Marshall
1974 Ben Kern
1973 Steve Spray
1972 Lee Trevino
1971 Gene Torres
1970 Gene Torres
1969 Gene Torres
1968 Ben Kern (amateur)
1967 Chuck Milne (amateur)
1966 Lee Trevino
1965 Sam Zimmerly (amateur)
1964 Don Klein
1963 Don Klein
1962 Herb Wimberly
1961 Fred Hawkins
1960 Herb Wimberly
1959 Chris Blocker (amateur)
1958 Hardy Loudermilk
1957 Iverson Martin
1956 J. D. Taylor
1955 J. D. Taylor
1954 Billy Moya (amateur)

External links
PGA of America – Sun Country section
List of winners

Golf in New Mexico
PGA of America sectional tournaments
State Open golf tournaments
1954 establishments in New Mexico
Recurring sporting events established in 1954